This is a list of reptiles of Finland. There are five species and all but one (Vipera berus) are protected by law. Currently Coronella austriaca is classified as vulnerable.

Lizards 
Sauria: 
 Viviparous lizard (Zootoca vivipara)
 Slowworm (Anguis fragilis)

Snakes 
Serpentes:
 Smooth snake (Coronella austriaca)
 Grass snake (Natrix natrix)
 Adder (Vipera berus)

Sources 
 THE REPTILES OF FINLAND Abstract of the article: Marika Rökman: Suomen luonnonvaraiset matelijat, Herpetomania vol.5.no.3-4/1996 pp.5-13
  Cox, N.A. and Temple, H.J. 2009. European Red List of Reptiles. Luxembourg: Office for Official Publications of the European Communities 

R
Finland
Finland
Reptiles